David Réal Caouette (September 26, 1917 – December 16, 1976) was a Canadian politician from Quebec. He was a member of Parliament (MP) and leader of the Social Credit Party of Canada and founder of the Ralliement des créditistes. Outside politics he worked as a car dealer.

His son, Gilles Caouette, was also a Social Credit MP and was briefly acting leader of the party.

Early political career
Caouette was born in Amos, in the Abitibi region of Quebec, the son of Marie (Cloutier) and Samuel Caouette. Caouette was converted to the social credit philosophy in 1939.  He was first elected to the House of Commons of Canada in a 1946 by-election in Pontiac for the Union des electeurs, a pro-Social Credit group in Quebec. He sat as a Social Credit MP once elected. In the 1949 election, his home was drawn into the newly created Villeneuve, and he was defeated as a Union des électeurs candidate.

Out of Parliament
He ran again in the 1953, 1957 and 1958 elections, but was unsuccessful each time.  He also ran provincially, for the Quebec Liberal Party, in the 1956 provincial election but was defeated. In 1958, he broke with Union des électeurs founders Louis Even and Gilberte Côté-Mercier, and joined Social Credit forming Ralliement des créditistes as the national party's Quebec wing of which he became the uncontested leader.

Leadership defeat
In 1961, he ran for leadership of the Social Credit Party, but lost to Robert N. Thompson, a Social Credit MP from Alberta. The totals were never released.

Caouette later claimed that on paper, he would have had enough support to win if not for Alberta Premier Ernest Manning intervening in favour of Thompson. According to Caouette, Manning told the Quebec delegates to vote for Thompson because Western Socreds would never accept a Francophone Catholic as party leader.

Breakthrough
In the 1962 election, Social Credit won 26 seats in Québec, led by Caouette, who returned as the member for Villeneuve.  He held this seat until 1966, when he transferred to the newly created Témiscamingue, a riding he would hold for the rest of his life. The party won only four seats in the rest of Canada. Under the circumstances, Thompson was all but forced to name Caouette as the party's deputy leader. Holding the balance of power in the House of Commons of Canada, Social Credit helped bring down the Progressive Conservative minority government of John Diefenbaker. However, in the 1963 election, Social Credit was reduced to 24 seats nationwide, all but four of which were in Quebec.

Caouette fought for bilingualism in the House of Commons, winning a symbolic victory when he got the Parliament's restaurant to produce bilingual menus.  In this, he anticipated the official bilingualism policy that would later be put into effect by Pierre Trudeau.

The Socred MPs from Québec considered Caouette as their true leader. Over time, Caouette came to believe that since the party was most successful in Québec, he should be the leader of the party instead of Thompson. As well, Caouette and his followers remained true believers in the social credit monetary theories of C.H. Douglas while Thompson and the party's two most powerful branches—in Alberta and British Columbia—had largely abandoned the theory. Thompson refused to step aside, prompting Caouette and virtually all of the Socred MPs from Quebec to split from the party in 1963 and establish the Ralliement des créditistes as a separate political party.

In the 1965 election, Caouette's Ralliement won nine seats, while Social Credit led by Thompson won five seats. In the 1968 election, Caouette's party won 14 seats while Social Credit won none.

The two parties were reunited under Caouette's leadership for the 1972 election. The reunited Socreds won 15 seats in that election, all in Québec. It would never elect another MP from English Canada, though it continued to nominate candidates outside of Québec.

Later political career
In the 1974 federal election, the Social Credit Party machine in Québec was wracked by internal divisions. Caouette was suffering from a snowmobiling accident, and therefore the powerful voice that had carried Social Credit in prior elections was silenced. When he was able to speak, Caouette focussed his attacks on the Progressive Conservatives and the New Democratic Party, instead of the Liberal Party, which was Social Credit's main competitor in Québec. Two weeks before the election was called, Caouette had informed the parliamentary caucus that he would resign as leader in the fall. Despite the party infighting, they managed 11 seats. Though this was one seat short of official status, the Speaker of the House of Commons agreed to recognize them as a party.

The decline of the party accelerated after Caouette resigned from the party leadership in 1976. Caouette had announced in 1975 that he would step down from the leadership within a year. He was hospitalized after a stroke on September 16, and died later that year.

After his death in 1976, Social Credit in Québec and at the federal Canadian level went into decline. The party fell to only six seats under Fabien Roy in the 1979 election. It was shut out of Parliament altogether in 1980, never to return. The party eventually folded in the 1990s.

Political views
Caouette mixed Social Credit's traditional social conservatism with ardent Québec nationalism. A populist leader and charismatic speaker, Caouette appealed to those who felt left out and pushed aside by financial institutions, traditional politicians, and what they perceived as elitist intellectuals.

Throughout the course of his career, Caouette was known for making controversial and intemperate statements. Shortly after World War II, Caouette claimed that his economic theories were the same as those of Benito Mussolini's government in Italy, and said that Mussolini and Adolf Hitler were his political heroes. During the October Crisis of 1970, he also claimed that leaders of the Communist Front de libération du Québec, which precipitated the October Crisis, should be shot by a firing squad. While such statements may have resonated with Créditiste supporters, they impaired the party's popularity with the mainstream electorate.

"The disdain for outsiders always seemed to fit conveniently with the theory of conspiracy of the old parties. The Jews were another and equally convenient part of the Creditiste demonology and there was a continuing strain of anti-Semitism. After the 1962 triumph, Caouette revealed that his political heroes were Hitler and Mussolini. As late as a few years ago, his bookshelves contained The Protocols of the Elders of Zion ... If non-Creditistes were horrified, the loyalists did not seem to care."—John Gray

See also
Politics of Québec
List of Québec general elections
Timeline of Québec history

Archives
There is a Réal Caouette fonds at Library and Archives Canada. Archival reference number is R7439.

References

External links

1917 births
1976 deaths
20th-century Canadian politicians
Anti-Masonry
Antisemitism in Canada
Canadian Roman Catholics
Canadian anti-communists
Canadian political party founders
Members of the House of Commons of Canada from Quebec
Neurological disease deaths in Ontario
People from Amos, Quebec
Social Credit Party of Canada MPs
Social Credit Party of Canada leaders